John George Herriot (1916 – 16 March 2003) was a mathematician at Stanford University who worked on numerical analysis.

Herriot received his Ph.D. from Brown University in 1941. He was a professor of mathematics and then of computer science at Stanford University from 1946 until his retirement in 1982. From 1953 to 1961 he was director of the Stanford Computation Center.

Selected publications
Cesàro summability of ordinary double Dirichlet series. Bull. Amer. Math. Soc. 46 (1940) Part 1: 920–929. 
Nörlund summability of double Fourier series. Trans. Amer. Math. Soc. 52 (1942) 72–94. 
"Blockage Corrections for Three-Dimensional-Flow Closed-Throat Wind Tunnels, With Consideration of the Effect of Compressibility." (1947).
with Stefan Bergman: 
Methods of mathematical analysis and computation. New York, Wiley (1963) xiii+198 p. diagrs., tables. 24 cm.
with Christian H. Reinsch:

References

MEMORIAL RESOLUTION JOHN G. HERRIOT

1916 births
2003 deaths
20th-century American mathematicians
21st-century American mathematicians
Brown University alumni
Stanford University faculty